Featuring Songs from Their Television Show is a studio album released by Donny & Marie Osmond in 1976. It has songs from their 1976 television series Donny & Marie. It has their hit song, "Deep Purple", as well as Donny's solo effort, a cover of "C'mon Marianne". The album reached No. 57 on the Billboard Top LPs chart on May 15, 1976. and was certified gold by the RIAA on December 23, 1976.

Track listing

Certifications

References

1976 albums
Donny Osmond albums
Marie Osmond albums
Albums produced by Mike Curb
Polydor Records albums